Dhemaji Engineering College (DEC) was established in 2020 by Assam Government at Tekjuri, Dhemaji district, Assam. The foundation stone of Dhemaji Engineering College was laid in 2011. On 22 February 2021 Prime Minister Narendra Modi formally inaugurated the college. The college starts to offer B.Tech degree from academic year 2020–21. The college is accredited by All India Council for Technical Education. The institution is affiliated to Assam Science and Technology University.

It is the seventh state government engineering college of Assam.

Academics

The college offers four year B.Tech degree in Computer Science and Engineering, Civil Engineering and Mechanical Engineering affiliated to Assam Science and Technology University.

Admissions
Students are taken in for the undergraduate courses through Assam Combined Entrance Examination (CEE) conducted by Assam Science and Technology University.
Lateral entry into the undergraduate courses are done through the Joint Lateral Entrance Examination (JLEE) conducted by Assam Science and Technology University.

References

Engineering colleges in Assam
Dhemaji district
2020 establishments in Assam
Educational institutions established in 2020